Akhmat Salpagarov (Russian: Ахмат Анзорович Салпагаров; born 13 January 1962) is a Russian politician serving as a senator from the People's Assembly of Karachay-Cherkessia since 25 September 2019.

Salpagarov is under personal sanctions introduced by the European Union, the United Kingdom, the USA, Canada, Switzerland, Australia, Ukraine, New Zealand, for ratifying the decisions of the "Treaty of Friendship, Cooperation and Mutual Assistance between the Russian Federation and the Donetsk People's Republic and between the Russian Federation and the Luhansk People's Republic" and providing political and economic support for Russia's annexation of Ukrainian territories.

Biography

Salpagarov was born on 13 January 1962 in Novy Karachay, Karachayevsky District. In 1984, he graduated from the Stavropol State Agrarian University. In 2005, Salpagarov also received a degree from the Russian State Social University. From 1978 to 2014, he occupied various positions in the private sector as commercial director, deputy head, and acting manager. In September 2014, he was elected deputy of the People's Assembly of Karachay-Cherkessia from the United Russia party. On 9 June 2015, he became the Senator from the People's Assembly of Karachay-Cherkessia. On 24 September 2019, he was re-elected.

References

Living people
1962 births
United Russia politicians
21st-century Russian politicians
People from Karachayevsky District
Members of the Federation Council of Russia (after 2000)